Villetoureix is a commune in the Dordogne department in Nouvelle-Aquitaine in southwestern France.

History
The oldest evidence of habitation date to Roman Gaul. The first attestation of the name is in the form Villatores. The name was formed from villa (village), and torre which meant defensive building.

Development of the village started in the 1600s, when the château de la Rigale was built.

Geography
Villetoureix is situated on a hill on the right bank of the river Dronne, near Ribérac, in the Périgord blanc area. The commune consists of the village Villetoureix and the minor settlements of la Pouyade, la Borie, Mayac and la Dérame. Neighbouring communes are Ribérac and Saint-Méard-de-Drône to the south, Celles to the east, Bertric-Burée to the north and Allemans to the west.

Demographics

See also
Communes of the Dordogne department

References

Communes of Dordogne